The Lycoming IO-720 engine is a large displacement, horizontally opposed, eight-cylinder aircraft engine featuring four cylinders per side, manufactured by Lycoming Engines.

There is no carburated version of the engine, which would have been designated O-720 and therefore the base model is the IO-720. The IO-720 and the Jabiru 5100 are the only flat-eight configuration aircraft engines currently in production.

Design and development
The engine has a fuel injection system which schedules fuel flow proportionally to the airflow, with fuel vaporization occurring at the intake ports. The engine has a displacement of 722 cubic inches (11.8 litres) and produces . The cylinders have air-cooled heads cast from aluminum alloy with a fully machined combustion chamber.

The first IO-720 was type certified on 25 October 1961 to the CAR 13 standard as amended to 15 June 1956 including 13-1, 13-2, 13-3, 13-4.

In 2009 a new IO-720-A1B cost US$113,621, with a rebuilt engine retailing for US$75,435 and a factory overhaul priced at US$66,289.

Variants
IO-720-A1A
Eight-cylinder, horizontally opposed, air-cooled direct drive, fuel injection, internal oil jet piston cooling, 722 cubic inches (11.8 litres), certified 25 October 1961
IO-720-A1B
fuel-injected, 722 cubic inches (11.8 litres), same as -A1A except equipped with Bendix S8LN-1208 and S8LN-1209 magnetos, certified 22 February 1971
IO-720-A1BD
fuel-injected, 722 cubic inches (11.8 litres), same as -A1B except has a dual magneto, certified 30 December 1976
IO-720-B1A
fuel-injected, 722 cubic inches (11.8 litres), same as -A1A except for top exhaust cylinders and offset exhaust valve shroud tubes, certified 4 November 1965
IO-720-B1B
fuel-injected, 722 cubic inches (11.8 litres), same as -B1A except equipped with Bendix S8LN-1208 and S8LN-1209 magnetos and Bendix RSA-10ED1 fuel injection, certified 22 February 1971
IO-720-B1BD
fuel-injected, 722 cubic inches (11.8 litres), same as -B1B except has a dual magneto, certified 30 December 1976
IO-720-C1B
fuel-injected, 722 cubic inches (11.8 litres), same as -A1B except that it has up-exhaust cylinder heads, certified 22 December 1971
IO-720-C1BD
fuel-injected, 722 cubic inches (11.8 litres), same as -C1B except has a dual magneto, certified 28 January 1977
IO-720-D1B
fuel-injected, 722 cubic inches (11.8 litres), same as -A1B except has a rear type air inlet housing instead of a front inlet, certified 29 October 1973
IO-720-D1BD
fuel-injected, 722 cubic inches (11.8 litres), same as -D1B except has a dual magneto, certified 28 January 1977
IO-720-D1C
fuel-injected, 722 cubic inches (11.8 litres), same as -D1B except equipped with an angled fuel injector adapter, certified 15 April 1982
IO-720-D1CD
fuel-injected, 722 cubic inches (11.8 litres), same as -D1C except has a dual magneto, certified 10 June 1977

Applications
IO-720-A1A
Northwest Ranger - factory installation
Piper Comanche 400 - factory installation

IO-720-A1B
Beechcraft 80 - Excalibur and Queen Air conversions
Helio Courier - Helio Courier H-800 factory installation
Pacific Aerospace FU-24-954
Piper PA-36 Pawnee Brave - Johnson Aircraft conversion

IO-720-A1BD
Barr 6

IO-720-B1A
Northwest Ranger C-6 - factory installation

IO-720-B1B
Aero Commander - MR. R.P.M. conversion

IO-720-B1BD
Aero Commander - MR. R.P.M. conversion

IO-720-D1B
Embraer EMB 202 Ipanema - factory installation

IO-720-D1C
Piper PA-36 Pawnee Brave - Johnson Aircraft conversion

IO-720-D1CD
Piper PA-36 Pawnee Brave - Johnson Aircraft conversion

Specifications (IO-720A)

See also
 Jabiru 5100

References

1960s aircraft piston engines
IO-720